Yan Marillat (born 12 August 1994) is a French professional footballer who plays as goalkeeper for  club Le Puy.

Career
Marillat made his professional debut for Nîmes in a 2–1 Ligue 2 loss to Orléans on 18 November 2016. On 28 August 2018, he transferred to Béziers.

Honours
Le Puy
 Championnat National 2: 2021–22

References

External links
 
 
 
 
 

1994 births
Living people
Sportspeople from La Tronche
French footballers
Footballers from Auvergne-Rhône-Alpes
Association football goalkeepers
Ligue 2 players
Championnat National 2 players
Championnat National 3 players
Championnat National players
AS Béziers (2007) players
Nîmes Olympique players
FC Sète 34 players
Grenoble Foot 38 players
Le Puy Foot 43 Auvergne players